Rik Taam (born 17 January 1997) is a Dutch athlete competing in the combined events. He represented his country at the 2021 European Indoor Championships narrowly missing out on a medal.

International competitions

Personal bests

Outdoor
100 metres – 10.63 (+1.9 m/s) (Götzis 2021)
400 metres – 48.13 (Götzis 2021)
1500 metres – 4:26.53 (Emmeloord 2020)
110 metres hurdles – 14.51 (+1.8 m/s) (Götzis 2021)
High jump – 2.09 (Amstelveen 2018)
Pole vault – 5.10 (Götzis 2021)
Long jump – 7.30 (+0.5 m/s, (Götzis 2021)
Shot put – 14.70 (Breda 2021)
Discus throw – 47.64 (Breda 2021)
Javelin throw – 58.87 (Gävle 2019)
Decathlon – 8107 (Breda 2021)
Indoor
60 metres – 6.92 (Apeldoorn 2017)
1000 metres – 2:35.31 (Apeldoorn 2021)
60 metres hurdles – 8.01 (Amsterdam 2020)
High jump – 2.04 (Toruń 2021)
Pole vault – 4.83 (Aubiére 2021)
Long jump – 7.30 (Apeldoorn 2019)
Shot put – 14.84 (Apeldoorn 2020)
Heptathlon – 6111 (Toruń 2021)

References

External links
Official site

1997 births
Living people
Dutch decathletes